1927 is a year in the Gregorian calendar.

1927 may also refer to:

 1927 (band), an Australian band
 1927 (album), the band's 1992 self-titled album
 1927 (theatre company), a British theatre company